Friendlier Up Here is the debut studio album by the Irish mod/pop rock quartet, The Aftermath. It was released on 25 April 2008.

The album featured three singles which had previously entered the Irish Singles Chart, all inside the Top 20; "One is Fun/Are You Not?" spent two weeks in the chart and peaked at #11, "Hollywood Remake/Need" also spent two weeks in the chart and peaked at #19 whilst latest single "All I Want is For You to Be Happy" spent a week in the chart at #13. The lead single was the album's opener "Are You Not Wanting Me Yet?".

The title comes from a lyric in the song "Northern Lingerie", which was later released as a single. It refers to what band member Johnny Cronin called "a safer zone for your listening pleasure" and is "a big LSD reference too" in homage to Echo & the Bunnymen.

Track listing
All songs written by The Aftermath.

Singles

Personnel
 Johnny Cronin - Lead vocals, rhythm guitar
 Justin McNabb - Lead guitar
 Martin Gray - Bass, backing vocals
 Michael Cronin - Drums, backing vocals

References 

2008 debut albums
The Aftermath (Irish band) albums